The National Sevens Tournament is a rugby union tournament played between teams from Montenegro.

History

2013-2014
Teams that participated: RK Mornar Bar, RFC Arsenal Tivat, RK Podgorica. This was the first 15-a-side tournament with was played locally with only Montenegrin clubs. Only three teams participated with them playing each other once and the best two play in a final.

Winner: RK Arsenal Tivat
Runner Up: RK Buducnost

2014-2015
Teams that participated: RK Lovcen Cetnije, RK Niksic, RK Mornar Bar, RK Arsenal Tivat, RK Buducnost  This was the height of participation with 5 strong teams would could all compete for the title. Each team played each other home and away twice. It was based as a league format and the top four would go into the semis play each other (1 vs 4 & 2 vs 3).

Winner: RK Niksic
Runner Up: RK Lovcen

2015-2016
no tournament

2016-2017
no tournament

Sevens Competitions in Montenegro 
Winners in sevens competitions in Montenegro by year:
 2013 RK Arsenal Tivat
 2014 RK Arsenal Tivat
 2015 RK Lovcen Cetnije
 2016 RK Podgorica
 2017 RK Podgorica

References 

Rugby union in Montenegro